Justine Henin was the defending champion, but retired from the sport on May 14, 2008.

Jelena Janković won in the final 6–4, 6–3, against Nadia Petrova. Janković became the highest ranking singles player by winning the final.

Seeds
The top four seeds received a bye into the second round.

Draw

Finals

Top half

Bottom half

External links
Draw and Qualifying Draw

Singles
Porsche Tennis Grand Prix